Proutia rotunda is a moth belonging to the family Psychidae. The species was first described by Esko Suomalainen in 1990.

It is native to Northern Europe.

References

Psychidae